HCM Rajasthan State Institute of Public Administration  is a state level civil service training institute of the Government of Rajasthan for training of civil servants. It is situated in Jaipur. The principal objective to contribute for the improvement of state administration through training, system research and management consultancy and to develop positive attitude and skill.

HCM RIPA has four Regional Training Centres located at Udaipur, Bikaner, Jodhpur and Kota. It conducts the foundational training for officials recruited to various state services, viz. Rajasthan Administrative Service, Rajasthan Police Service, Rajasthan Accounts Service, and others. It also organizes professional training for the officers of  Indian Administrative Service (Allotted to Rajasthan).

The institute is named after the former Chief Minister of Rajasthan, late Harish Chandra Mathur, in recognition of his contributions to the state.

External links
 Official Website of HCM RIPA Jaipur

Public administration schools in India
Universities and colleges in Jaipur
State agencies of Rajasthan
1957 establishments in Rajasthan
Educational institutions established in 1957